Rabin Shrestha (born 17 May 1991) is a footballer from Nepal. He made his first appearance for the Nepal national football team in 2008.

Club career 
Rabin Shrestha is a Nepalese defender who was born in Jaleswor. After graduating from ANFA Academy he joined the Sankata Boys Sports Club but a year later he signed for the Nepal Police Club in 2008.

In April 2014 Shrestha was heavenly linked with a move to the Manang Marshyangdi Club, although former player and coach Hari Khadka dismissed it as just a rumor.

International career 
Shresta played in the 2011 SAFF Championship and 2013 SAFF Championship for Nepal. In the latter tournament he received the best player award.

References 

1991 births
Living people
People from Mahottari District
Nepalese footballers
Nepal international footballers
Footballers at the 2014 Asian Games
Association football defenders
Asian Games competitors for Nepal